Trim tabs are small surfaces connected to the trailing edge of a larger control surface on a boat or aircraft, used to control the trim of the controls, i.e. to counteract hydro- or aerodynamic forces and stabilise the boat or aircraft in a particular desired attitude without the need for the operator to constantly apply a control force. This is done by adjusting the angle of the tab relative to the larger surface.

Changing the setting of a trim tab adjusts the neutral or resting position of a control surface (such as an elevator or rudder). As the desired position of a control surface changes (corresponding mainly to different speeds), an adjustable trim tab will allow the operator to reduce the manual force required to maintain that position—to zero, if used correctly. Thus the trim tab acts as a servo tab. Because the center of pressure of the trim tab is farther away from the axis of rotation of the control surface than the center of pressure of the control surface, the moment generated by the tab can match the moment generated by the control surface. The position of the control surface on its axis will change until the torques from the control surface and the trim surface balance each other.

Uses in boats 

Planing boats or boats that operate at speeds close to planing will often have trim tabs attached to the lower unit of the engine or the transom.  These are used to adjust the pitch attitude of the boat while under way.  The most efficient pitch attitude changes with speed, so trim tabs are adjusted based on speed and weight placement to maintain an efficient pitch attitude.

Uses in aircraft 

All fixed-wing aircraft must have a system to allow the pilot to determine the airspeed, and maintain that airspeed with a minimum of control force and mental concentration. Elevator trim frees the pilot from exerting constant force on the pitch controls. Instead, the pilot adjusts a longitudinal trim control (often in the form of a wheel) to cancel out control forces for a given airspeed and weight distribution. Typically, when this trim control (wheel or lever) is rotated or moved forward, the nose pitches down; conversely, if the trim control is moved back, the tail becomes "heavy", and the nose pitches up. Many newer aircraft, especially jet aircraft, have electric trim controls.

Many airplanes also have rudder and/or aileron trim systems. On some of these, the rudder trim tab is rigid but adjustable on the ground by bending: it is angled slightly to the left (when viewed from behind) to lessen the need for the pilot to push the rudder pedal constantly to overcome the left-turning tendencies of many prop-driven aircraft. Some aircraft have hinged rudder trim tabs that the pilot can adjust in flight.

Most fixed-wing aircraft have a trim tab on the elevator. However, alternative means of controlling the speed and attitude of the aircraft are sometimes used, including:
 a spring included in the control system that can be adjusted by the pilot
 in the case of the elevator, an all-moving horizontal stabilizer, called a stabilator, the position of which can be adjusted in flight by a servo tab or an anti-servo tab.
 On some aircraft (e.g. Concorde, McDonnell Douglas MD-11), fuel may be shifted to tanks in the tail during cruise to reposition the center of gravity in order to reduce trim drag. Maintaining the center of gravity near the aft-most limit for cruise improves cruise efficiency.

When a servo tab is employed, it is moved into the slipstream opposite to the control surface's desired deflection. For example, in order to trim an elevator to hold the nose down, the elevator's trim tab will actually rise up into the slipstream. The increased pressure on top of the trim tab surface caused by raising it will then deflect the entire elevator slab down slightly, causing the tail to rise and the aircraft's nose to move down. In the case of an aircraft where deployment of high-lift devices (flaps) would significantly alter the longitudinal trim, a supplementary trim tab is arranged to simultaneously deploy with the flaps so that pitch attitude is not markedly changed.

The use of trim tabs significantly reduces pilots' workload during continuous maneuvers (e.g. sustained climb to altitude after takeoff or descent prior to landing), allowing them to focus their attention on other tasks such as traffic avoidance or communication with air traffic control.

Both elevator trim and pitch trim affect the small trimming part of the elevator on jet airliners. The former is supposed to be set in a certain position for a longer time, while the pitch trim (controlled with the landing pilot's thumb on the yoke or joystick, and thereby easy to maneuver) is used all the time after the flying pilot has disabled the autopilot, especially after each time the flaps are lowered or at every change in the airspeed, at the descent, approach and final. Elevator trim is most used for controlling the attitude at cruising by the autopilot.

Beyond reducing pilot workload, proper trim also increases fuel efficiency by reducing drag. For example, propeller aircraft have a tendency to yaw when operating at high power, for instance when climbing; this increases parasitic drag because the craft is not flying straight into the apparent wind. In such circumstances, the use of an adjustable rudder trim tab can reduce yaw.

Military
On military aircraft during wartime, trim tabs often served as unintentional backup control systems for aircraft with damaged controls. Since trim tabs are usually controlled by their own dedicated system of control cables, rods, and/or hydraulic lines, aircraft that had suffered loss of primary controls could often be flown home "on the trim tabs", or by using trim adjustment as a replacement for the non-working primary controls. Such control is effective, if slower and more limited than primary controls, but it does allow the aircraft to be controlled and directed. In other cases, such as engine failure or damage causing asymmetric drag, trim tabs were invaluable for allowing the pilot to fly the aircraft straight without having to apply a constant force on the stick or rudder to keep the aircraft flying straight.

Trim tabs were also important for aircraft such as bombers, which often underwent rapid changes in center-of-gravity when the bombload was dropped, requiring a hand ready on the trim-adjusting wheel to counteract the tendency of the aircraft to pitch up or down. Undertaking high-speed dives or deploying flaps also generally necessitated pitch trim adjustment, as aircraft of the era had different pitch tendencies at different airspeeds, and flaps could change the center of pressure.

Consumption of fuel could require periodic trim adjustment during a long flight, as it was difficult to ensure that all fuel tanks were equally near the center of gravity. An extreme example was the later P-51 Mustang, which was given a large fuel tank behind the cockpit to allow long-range missions; as fuel from this tank was consumed it was necessary for regular adjustment of the elevator trim.

As a metaphor 

Designer Buckminster Fuller is often cited for his use of trim tabs as a metaphor for leadership and personal empowerment. In the February 1972 issue of Playboy, Fuller said:

The official newsletter of the Buckminster Fuller Institute is called "Trimtab".

Fuller's metaphor received considerable media attention in January 2019 when actor Jeff Bridges appreciated it in his Cecil B. DeMille Award acceptance speech at the 76th Golden Globes:

See also 

 Servo tab

References 

Aircraft controls
Aircraft wing design
Watercraft components